USC Libraries can refer to:

 The University of South Carolina Libraries
 The University of Southern California Libraries